A by-election was held for the New South Wales Legislative Assembly electorate of Castlereagh on 20 February 1915 following the death of John Treflé.

Dates

Result

John Treflé died.

See also
Electoral results for the district of Castlereagh
List of New South Wales state by-elections

Notes

References

1915 elections in Australia
New South Wales state by-elections
1910s in New South Wales